Ajay Kumar Reddy (born 3 June 1990) is an Indian blind cricketer classified under B2 category who is also the current captain of the India national blind cricket team. He captained the Indian team which lifted the 2017 Blind T20 World Cup and the 2018 Blind Cricket World Cup.

Biography 
Ajay Kumar was born on 3 June 1990 in Guntur district, Andhra Pradesh. He lost his vision when he was a child due to an accident which resulted in an eye infection to his left eye and it hampered him for most part of his pre-teen years. In 2002 at the age of 12, he was sent to the Lutheran High School for the Blind which is located in Narsaraopet as he was advised by the doctors to go to a blind school to continue his studies. His father was a farmer.

Career 
He was called into the Indian blind cricket team to a tour to England to play against England in 2010. He made his debut in 2010 and performed well in his debut tour claiming two man of the match awards. Due to his blistering performances, he was named as the vice-captain of the national blind cricket team in 2012. Ajay Kumar Reddy was named in the Indian squad for the inaugural edition of the Blind T20 World Cup in 2012 which was captained by Shekhar Naik. He played a key role in India's triumph at the 2012 Blind T20 World Cup including a match winning 33 ball century against England in a group stage match.

He was also named as a member of the Indian blind cricket team for the 2014 Blind Cricket World Cup. In the 2014 Blind Cricket World Cup final, his aggressive batting approach helped India to secure their maiden Blind Cricket World Cup title as they chased a target in excess of 300 against arch-rivals Pakistan in the finals.

In 2016, he was appointed as the captain of the Indian national blind cricket team after the retirement of Shekhar Naik. He led the Indian team which won the inaugural edition of the Blind T20 Asia Cup in 2016 defeating Pakistan in the final.

Ajay Kumar played a vital role in India's triumph at the 2017 Blind T20 World Cup as he claimed 9 wickets in the tournament to be the leading wicket taker in the series. He captained the national side in retaining the T20 World Cup title for the second consecutive time thus becoming the second captain to have lifted the Blind T20 World Cup trophy after Shekhar Naik.

He continued his good captaincy and dominance in blind cricket as he led the Indian blind cricket team which also consisted Deepak Malik that secured its second successive 40 over Blind Cricket World Cup title after beating arch-rivals Pakistan in a thrilling encounter by 2 wickets chasing 309 runs to win the 2018 Blind Cricket World Cup. He played a crucial part of the Indian batting with scoring 63 runs in the final.

References

External links 
 Profile at CricHQ

1990 births
Living people
Indian cricketers
Blind cricketers
Indian blind people
People from Guntur district